Snow Chief (March 17, 1983 in California – May 18, 2010) was an American Champion Thoroughbred racehorse.

Background
Snow Chief was bred by Carl Grinstead. In 1984, retired vaudevillian and successful real estate investor Ben Rochelle bought a fifty percent interest in Grinstead's Blue Diamond Ranch, thus becoming a half owner of the yearling. Snow Chief was one of several winners produced by the mare Miss Snowflake: the others included Mujaazif, who won the Royal Lodge Stakes in 1990.

Racing career

1985: two-year-old season
Conditioned by veteran California trainer Mel Stute, Snow Chief made nine starts at age two, winning five, including the Norfolk Stakes and the Hollywood Futurity. His 1985 performances earned him California Horse of the Year honors, but Tasso, the 1985 Breeders' Cup Juvenile winner, was voted the Eclipse Award for American Champion Two-Year-Old Colt.

1986: three-year-old season
As a three-year-old, Snow Chief made a further nine starts. In California, he won two stakes races, then was sent to Florida, where he won the important Florida Derby. Back in California, he established himself as the solid Kentucky Derby favorite with a win in that state's most important race for three-year-olds, the Santa Anita Derby.

Snow Chief was sent off at even money as the bettors' choice in the Kentucky Derby but in a sixteen-horse field, he finished eleventh to winner Ferdinand. However, Snow Chief returned to form in the Preakness Stakes, defeating runner-up Ferdinand by four lengths.

His handlers chose not to run him in the 1½ mile Belmont Stakes. Instead they later sent him to Garden State Park, where he won the Jersey Derby. For his performances in 1986, Snow Chief was named California Horse of the Year for the second straight year and was voted American Champion Three-Year-Old Male Horse.

1987: four-year-old season
Snow Chief returned to racing as a four-year-old in 1987. From six starts, he won two and earned three seconds. His wins came in the Charles H. Strub Stakes at Santa Anita Racetrack in California and the Oaklawn Handicap at Oaklawn Park Race Track in Arkansas. He was voted California Horse of the Year for the third time.

Stud career
He was retired to stud duty, producing offspring that have met with modest success. He stood at Diane Rochelle's Eagle Oak Ranch in Paso Robles, California, and died due to an apparent heart attack on the morning of May 18, 2010.

Pedigree

References
 Snow Chief's pedigree and partial racing stats
 Video at YouTube of Snow Chief winning the 1986 Santa Anita Derby
 May 26, 1986 Sports Illustrated article titled A Day Of Redemption For The Chief
 Bloodhorse.com video profile of Mel Stute with Snow Chief
 Snow Chief at the Thoroughbred Times Interactive Stallion Directory

1983 racehorse births
2010 racehorse deaths
Racehorses bred in California
Racehorses trained in the United States
Preakness Stakes winners
Eclipse Award winners
American Grade 1 Stakes winners
Thoroughbred family 9-e